The Tropical Park Derby is an American Thoroughbred horse race currently run at Gulfstream ParkHallandale Beach, Florida in mid-December. It is an ungraded stakes race for 3-year-olds with a purse of $75,000 run over the turf at  miles.

Prior to 2014, the race was held at Calder Race Course in Miami Gardens, Florida. The race was once held in early January, often on New Year's Day, which made it the first "derby" of the year. In 2011, Calder ran the race twice: once in January and again in October. In 2012 and 2013, it was run in October only. In 2014, the race was moved to Gulfstream Park and run in December.

Inaugurated in 1976, the Tropical Park Derby was named for the old Tropical Park Race Track in Miami. It was once thought of as the first step on the American Triple Crown trail. In 2006, Barbaro became the first winner of the race to subsequently win the Kentucky Derby.

Due to financial pressure, Calder did not run the race in 2009. The race was downgraded from a Grade III race in 2011 by the American Graded Stakes Committee.

The race has been run under the following combinations of distance and surface:
  miles on turf - 2014–present
  miles on turf - 1994-2013 (except in 2002 and 2012 when weather conditions caused the race to be moved to the main track)
  miles on dirt - 1976-1985
  miles on dirt - 1986-1993

Past winners
 2015 - Solemn Tribute
 2014 - Sky Flight
 2013 - Amen Kitten
 2012 - Csaba
 2011 (October) - Oligarch
 2011 (January) - King Congie
 2010 - Fly by Phil (Eduardo Núñez)
 2008 - Cowboy Cal (John Velazquez)
 2007 - Soldier's Dancer (Cornelio Velásquez)
 2006 - Barbaro
 2005 - Lord Robyn
 2004 - Kitten's Joy
 2003 - Nothing to Lose
 2002‡- Political Attack (Mark Guidry)
 2001 - Proud Man
 2000 - Go Lib Go
 1999 - Valid Reprized
 1998 - Draw Again
 1997 - Arthur L.
 1996 - Ok By Me
 1995 - Mecke
 1994 - Fabulous Frolic
 1993 - Summer Set
 1992 - Technology
 1991 - Jackie Wackie

 ‡ In 2002, the race was run off the turf, but retained its GIII status.

Notes

External links
Calder Race Course official website

Tropical Park Race Track
Recurring sporting events established in 1976
Horse races in Florida
Calder Race Course
Flat horse races for three-year-olds
Turf races in the United States
Triple Crown Prep Races
Graded stakes races in the United States
1976 establishments in Florida